Rock Prairie Township is a township in Dade County, in the U.S. state of Missouri.

Rock Prairie Township was named after a nearby prairie of the same name.

References

Townships in Missouri
Townships in Dade County, Missouri